Anse La Raye or Anse-La-Raye is the largest town and seat of the Anse la Raye District of Saint Lucia. It is located on the island's western side, near Marigot Bay, and has several examples of French and English colonial architecture.

History
The name Anse la Raye is derived from the rays that are found in the bay, the English translation means Bay of Rays. Two rivers flow into the bay, these are the Grande Rivière de l'Anse la Raye and the Petite Rivière de l'Anse la Raye. On a Friday night there is a fish fry where lobsters, fish and lambi (conch) are cooked and eaten. The fish fry is located on Front Street, which runs parallel to the beach.

The local Catholic church was built in 1907, but records show that a chapel has existed since 1765. The present church has murals painted by the St Omer Family. Nearby attractions include the Anse la Raye Falls and the River Rock Falls.

The town is noted for its youth music groups, the "Cecilian Reys" and the "Anse La Raye Youth Orchestra", both of which were formed under the direction of Petronilla Deterville. Performing since 1981 throughout the country, the group aims to expand the cultural experiences of youth from the area.

See also
Geography of Saint Lucia
List of cities in Saint Lucia
List of rivers of Saint Lucia
Districts of Saint Lucia

Scenes

References

Populated coastal places in Saint Lucia
Towns in Saint Lucia